Grosse Pointe Farms is a city in Wayne County in the U.S. state of Michigan. The population was 9,479 at the 2010 census. 

As part of the Grosse Pointe collection of cities, it is a northeastern city of Metro Detroit and shares a small western border with the city of Detroit.  Grosse Pointe Farms was originally incorporated as a village in 1893 and again as a city in 1949.

History 
The area that would become Grosse Pointe Farms was originally incorporated as the Village of Grosse Pointe in 1879.  By 1889, the village extended from land just above Provencal Road in the northeast to Cadieux Road in the west.  In 1893, the portion of the village east of Fisher Road broke off and incorporated as the Village of Grosse Pointe Farms after a dispute over the location of a tavern.  It was not until 1949, however, that the village incorporated as a city.

The U.S. Postal Service operates the Grosse Pointe Post office in Grosse Pointe Farms.

Geography 

The water is part of Lake St. Clair.

The Farms has a more varied topography and streetscape than the other southern Grosse Pointes. While Grosse Pointe and Grosse Pointe Park are built on a standard street grid and are basically flat, Grosse Pointe Farms is partially built on the same grid flowing out of Detroit, but also features districts with irregular, curving street paths. A low but noticeable ridge runs through the center of the city. The Farms also contains the "point" in Grosse Pointe, where, just east of the Grosse Pointe War Memorial, there is a large bend in the lakeshore, such that those on the shoreline face east, instead of south, as they do when on the shoreline of neighboring Grosse Pointe, closer to the entrance of the Detroit River.

The cityscape varies widely, with large sections of old homes ranging from bungalows to mansions, and a few newer sections with ranch houses or luxury homes built on subdivided estates. The Farms has a downtown on Kercheval Avenue combining historic buildings with newer, neo-traditional storefronts.

Demographics

2010 census
As of the census of 2010, there were 9,479 people, 3,718 households, and 2,770 families residing in the city. The racial makeup of the city was 95.4% White, 1.8% African American, 0.2% Native American, 1.3% Asian, 0.4% from other races, and 1.0% from two or more races. Hispanic or Latino of any race were 2.0% of the population.

There were 3,718 households, of which 33.7% had children under the age of 18 living with them, 66.0% were married couples living together, 6.2% had a female householder with no husband present, 2.3% had a male householder with no wife present, and 25.5% were non-families. 23.0% of all households were made up of individuals, and 12.3% had someone living alone who was 65 years of age or older. The average household size was 2.55 and the average family size was 3.02.

The median age in the city was 45.1 years. 25.8% of residents were under the age of 18; 4.8% were between the ages of 18 and 24; 19.5% were from 25 to 44; 32.6% were from 45 to 64; and 17.5% were 65 years of age or older. The gender makeup of the city was 48.8% male and 51.2% female.

2000 census
At the 2000 census, there were 9,764 people, 3,804 households, and 2,868 families residing in the city. The racial makeup of the city was 97.58% White, 0.65% African American, 0.11% Native American, 1.13% Asian, 0.11% from other races, and 0.42% from two or more races. Hispanic or Latino of any race were 1.11% of the population.

There were 3,804 households, of which 34.3% had children under the age of 18 living with them, 67.8% were married couples living together, 6.1% had a female householder with no husband present, and 24.6% were non-families. 22.3% of all households were made up of individuals, and 12.0% had someone living alone who was 65 years of age or older.  The average household size was 2.57 and the average family size was 3.03.

Age distribution was 26.5% under the age of 18, 3.6% from 18 to 24, 23.4% from 25 to 44, 28.6% from 45 to 64, and 17.9% who were 65 years of age or older. The median age was 43 years. For every 100 females, there were 90.6 males. For every 100 females age 18 and over, there were 87.5 males.

The median household income was $100,153, and the median family income was $109,264. Males had a median income of $87,108 versus $53,241 for females. The per capita income for the city was $54,846. About 1.5% of families and 2.1% of the population were below the poverty line, including 3.1% of those under age 18 and 1.4% of those age 65 or over.

Climate

Economy
The largest employer in Grosse Pointe Farms is the Grosse Pointe Schools. The second largest employer is the Country Club of Detroit.

Education

Primary and secondary schools
The community is served by Grosse Pointe Public Schools (GPPSS). Public schools within Grosse Pointe Farms include Père Gabriel Richard Elementary School, Kerby Elementary School, Brownell Middle School, and Grosse Pointe South High School. Along with Richard and Kerby, Monteith Elementary School in Grosse Pointe Woods serves a section of the city. All residents are zoned to Brownell. Almost all residents are zoned to GPS High, while those in a northwest section are zoned to Grosse Pointe North High School in Grosse Pointe Woods.

Saint Paul Catholic School is in Grosse Pointe Farms.

Public libraries
The Grosse Pointe Public Library operates the Central Branch in Grosse Pointe Farms.

Notable people
 Anna Thompson Dodge, heiress and philanthropist, widow of Dodge automotive founder Horace Elgin Dodge, lived and died in Grosse Pointe Farms.
 Elena Ford, is the daughter of Charlotte Ford, granddaughter of Henry Ford II, and great, great-granddaughter of Henry Ford.
 Meg White of the White Stripes grew up in Grosse Pointe Farms, according to her former husband, John "Jack" White, né Gillis.
Gretchen Valade, heiress to the  Carhartt fortune, former chairman of Carhartt, founder of jazz label Mack Avenue Records, philanthropist

Images

References

External links

 
 Grosse Pointe Historical Society

Cities in Wayne County, Michigan
Lake St. Clair
Metro Detroit
Michigan populated places on Lake St. Clair
Populated places established in 1893
1893 establishments in Michigan